The Matala Power Station is a hydroelectric power station across the Kunene River, in Angola, that has installed generation capacity of . The power station came online in 1954.

Location
The power station lies on the banks of the Kunene River, in the town of Matala, in Huíla Province, in southwestern Angola. The geographical coordinates of Matala Hydroelectric Power Station are 14°44'38.0"S, 15°02'31.0"E (Latitude:-14.743889; Longitude:15.041944).

History
In 1954, Matala Dam was commissioned with a dual purpose of providing water for irrigation to the region and supplying electricity to southwestern Angola. The original installed capacity of 39 megawatts was never achieved, but subsequent repairs in 2001, 2011 and 20116 have attempted to achieve generation capacity of at least 40 megawatts.

Specifications
Other components of the complex include an inlet, an outlet, movable gates, electrical mechanical hardware, powerlines and switching gear.

Repairs and refurbishment
Established in 1954, the dam has been repaired in 2001 and 2011. In 2011, Empresa Publica de Producao de Electricidade (PRODEL), the owner of the power station hired SNC Lavalin Inc., a Canadian enterprise to "improve the facility’s safety and its water storage capacity" at a contract price of US$249.6 million. The repairs were carried out in phases.

See also
 List of power stations in Angola

References

External links

 Angola: Second Rehabilitation Phase of Matala Dam to Start This Year As of May 2016.

Buildings and structures in Huíla Province
Energy infrastructure completed in 1954
Hydroelectric power stations in Angola
1954 establishments in Angola